The Lower Paunglaung Dam is a rock-fill embankment dam on the Paunglaung River, about  east of Pyinmana in Naypyidaw Union Territory, Burma. The primary purpose of the dam is hydroelectric power generation and it had been under study since 1953. Construction began in 1996 and the first generators were commissioned in 2004 and the last in 2005. Cost of the dam and power station, funded by the Chinese government, was US$201.8 million. The dam's power house is located underground near the toe and spillway. It contains four  Francis turbine-generators. The Upper Paunglaung Dam, being constructed upstream, is expected to regulate the river and improved power generation.

See also

Dams in Burma
 List of power stations in Burma

References

Dams completed in 2005
Energy infrastructure completed in 2004
Energy infrastructure completed in 2005
Dams in Myanmar
Hydroelectric power stations in Myanmar
Rock-filled dams
Buildings and structures in Naypyidaw
Underground power stations